Jakob Kristelstein (16 May 1889 Udriku – 31 May 1968 Tallinn) was an Estonian politician. He was a member of Estonian National Assembly.

References

1889 births
1968 deaths
Members of the Estonian National Assembly
Hugo Treffner Gymnasium alumni
Gulag detainees
People from Kadrina Parish
Burials at Rahumäe Cemetery